Ajagajantharam is a 2021 Indian Malayalam-language action thriller film directed by Tinu Pappachan and written by Kichu Tellus and Vineeth Vishwam. Antony Varghese, Kichu Tellus, Arjun Ashokan and Sabumon Abdul Samad are. The film is produced by Emmanuel Joseph and Ajith Thalapilliy and the music composed by Justin Varghese. The film was scheduled to release on 26 February 2021, but postponed due the second wave of COVID-19 shutdowns. The film was released worldwide on 23 December 2021 and was a blockbuster, emerging as the Christmas winner amongst Meow and Kunjeldho.

Premise 
The village of Aranjali is celebrating its annual temple festival, where most of the youth and middle-aged villagers are consumed by alcohol, substances and ego. Lali, who supplies elephants for festivals comes with an elephant for the first time in Aranjali and is a bit uninhibited and carries on himself with high ego. When an unemployed youth of the village tries to be a bit brash and bumptious with him, Lali kicks him to the ground for being in his face for long. This incident triggers a chain of events involving the mahout's group, unemployed village youths, notorious criminals, drama troop and some trouble-loving villagers which end-up starting a full scale mayhem to the place.

Cast 
 Antony Varghese as Lali
 Arjun Ashokan as Kannan
Kichu Tellus as Ambi
 Sabumon Abdusamad as Kachamber Das
Vineeth Vishwam as Vinu
Anil Nedumangad as Sony
Sudhi Koppa as Pindy
Lukman Avaran
Tito Wilson as Kottappuram Surendran
 Jaffar Idukki as Committee President 
Bitto Davis as Pottachira Hari
Vijilesh Karayad as Eden
 Sinoj Varghese as Joly
Sree Renjini as Meera
Chemban Vinod Jose as Aliyan (cameo appearance)
 Nadackal Unnikrishnan (Elephant) as Neysseri Parthan

Production 
Both Antony and Tinu had earlier collaborated in the latter's debut directorial Swathanthryam Ardharathriyil, which was a thriller. The film is produced by Emmanuel Joseph and Ajith Thalapilliy and the music composed by Justin Varghese. The title for the film is given by Lijo Jose Pellissery. Ajagajantharam has been written by Kichu Tellus and Vineeth Vishwam. Jinto George is the cinematographer while Shameer Muhammad is the editor. Arjun Kallingal is the still photographer.

Music

Songs

Background Score

Release
Initially the film was scheduled to be released in theatres on 26 February 2021, but was postponed due to COVID-19 pandemic in India. The film fixed its release date as May 28, 2021, but again got postponed. The film was scheduled to be released by the eve of Dusshera (12 October 2021), but got postponed yet again. The film was planned to be released on 3 December 2021

Reception
The New Indian Express gave a rating of 3.5 on 5 and wrote "Ajagajantharam is, to put it simply, a riotous display of unchecked aggression and unbridled chaos. It doesn't require one to feel emotionally attached to any particular character. We are only required to be invested in the mayhem caused by a bunch of man-children with brittle egos. But, if one were to pick a side to root for, regardless of your disagreement with the way he generally conducts himself, it has to be Antony Varghese's character whose name I can't recall right now because this is that film where you remember the faces more than the names. Nothing wrong with that."

References

External links 

2021 action films
2020s Malayalam-language films